Andreson is a surname. Notable people with the surname include:

Cornelius Andreson (fl. 1674–1675), Dutch pirate, privateer, and soldier
Laura Andreson (1902–1999), American ceramic artist and educator
Andreson (footballer) (born 1985), Andreson Dourado Ribas, Brazilian football midfielder

See also
Anderson (surname)